Samir Karnik, is an Indian film director, producer and screenwriter of Hindi movies.

Career
Karnik made his directorial debut with the film Kyun! Ho Gaya Na... in 2004 starring Aishwarya Rai and Vivek Oberoi. He produced and directed the film Heroes in 2008. He has also written the story and dialogues of some of his movies.

His directorial venture Yamla Pagla Deewana starring Dharmendra, Sunny Deol and Bobby Deol was released on 14 January 2011.

Filmography

References

External links
 

Living people
Hindi-language film directors
Film directors from Delhi
Indian male screenwriters
1974 births
21st-century Indian film directors